Fartura is a municipality in the state of São Paulo in Brazil. The population is 16,070 (2020 est.) in an area of 429 km². The elevation is 516 m.

References

Municipalities in São Paulo (state)